Carinotrachia is a genus of medium-sized air-breathing land snails, terrestrial pulmonate gastropods in the family Camaenidae.

Species
Species within the genus Carinotrachia include:
 Carinotrachia admirale Köhler, 2010
 Carinotrachia carsoniana Solem, 1985 - the type species

References

 
Camaenidae
Taxonomy articles created by Polbot